Angiomas are benign tumors derived from cells of the vascular or lymphatic vessel walls (endothelium) or derived from cells of the tissues surrounding these vessels.

Angiomas are a frequent occurrence as patients age, but they might be an indicator of systemic problems such as liver disease. They are not commonly associated with cancer.

Signs and symptoms

Angiomas usually appear at or near the surface of the skin anywhere on the body, and may be considered bothersome depending on their location. However, they may be present as symptoms of another more serious disorder, such as cirrhosis.  When they are removed, it is generally for cosmetic reasons.

Types

 Hemangiomas
 Capillary: Cherry hemangioma, Infantile haemangioma
 Cavernous
 Pyogenic granuloma

 Lymphangiomas
 Capillary (simple)
 Cavernous (cystic)

 Glomus tumor
 Vascular ectasias
 Naevus flammeus
 Telangiectasia - Spider, Hereditary hemorrhagic

 Reactive vascular proliferations
 Bacillary angiomatosis

See also
Angiomatosis
Angiomatosis retinae
List of cutaneous conditions
Vascular anomalies

References

External links

Dermal and subcutaneous growths
Benign neoplasms